Asticcacaulis biprosthecum is a stalked bacterial species phylogenetically closely related to the species Caulobacter crescentus. However, instead of a single polar organelle called the stalk, Asticcacaulis biprosthecum possesses two stalks that are laterally positioned along the cylindrical cell body. The ecological significance of this arrangement is unknown.

References

Caulobacterales
Bacteria described in 1964